Long Harbour Aerodrome  is located  west northwest of Long Harbour, British Columbia, Canada.

References

Registered aerodromes in British Columbia
Salt Spring Island